Maria Fricioiu (later Simion, born 16 March 1960) is a retired Romanian rower. Competing in coxed fours she won an Olympic gold medal in 1984 and three medals at the world championships in 1979, 1983 and 1985.

References

External links
 
 
 
 

1960 births
Living people
Romanian female rowers
Rowers at the 1980 Summer Olympics
Rowers at the 1984 Summer Olympics
Olympic gold medalists for Romania
Olympic rowers of Romania
World Rowing Championships medalists for Romania
Medalists at the 1984 Summer Olympics
20th-century Romanian women